Robert, Rob, Robbie, Bob, or Bobby Young may refer to:

Academics
 R. A. Young (Robert Arthur Young, 1871–1959), British physician
 Robert J. C. Young (born 1950), British cultural critic and historian
 Robert J. Young (born 1942), Canadian historian
 Robert M. Young (academic) (1935–2019), American science historian and psychoanalyst
 Robert W. Young (1912–2007), American linguist
 Robert Young (materials scientist) (born 1948), British materials scientist
 Robert S. Young, professor of coastal geology
 R. V. Young (born 1947), professor of English at North Carolina State University
 Robert Burns Young (1874–1949), Scottish geologist at Witwatersrand University

Entertainment

Film and television
 Bob Young (news anchor) (1923–2011), American host of ABC Evening News
 Bob Young (TV producer), American television writer and producer
 Robert F. Young (1915–1986), American science fiction writer
 Robert M. Young (director) (born 1924), American director, writer, and producer
 Robert O. Young (born 1952), American author of books about alternative medicine
 Robert Young (actor) (1907–1998), American actor
 Robert Young (director) (born 1933), British film and television director
 Robert Young, pen name of British writer Robert Payne (1911–1984)

Music and radio
 Robert Herbert Young (1923-2011), American musician and composer
 Bob Young (musician) (born 1945), English musician and author
 Red Top Young (born 1936), American musician
 Robbie Young (bassist), bass player with American metal band Silent Civilian
 Robert Young (musician) (1964–2014), lead guitarist with Primal Scream
 Rob Young (born 1968), author of the 2011 book about British folk music Electric Eden
 Rob Young (broadcaster), British broadcaster
 Rob Young (sound engineer), Canadian sound engineer

Military
 Robert Benjamin Young (1773–1846), British sea captain at the Battle of Trafalgar
 Robert H. Young (1929–1950), U.S. Army soldier, Medal of Honor recipient
 Robert Nicholas Young (1900–1964), Lieutenant General in the United States Army
 Robert Young (New Zealand Army officer) (1877–1953), New Zealand military officer

Politics
 Robert P. Young Jr. (born 1951), former Michigan Supreme Court Justice and 2018 candidate for U.S. Senate
 Robert Young (Canadian politician) (1834–1904), Canadian politician and businessman
 Robert Young (Hawaii chief) (1796–1813), Hawaiian chief
 Robert Young (Islington North MP) (1891–1985), British Member of Parliament for Islington North
 Robert Young (trade unionist) (1872–1957), British Member of Parliament for Newton
 Robert A. Young (1923–2007), member of the U.S. House of Representatives from Missouri
 Robert R. Young (politician), member of the Wisconsin State Assembly
 Rob Young (diplomat) (born 1945), British diplomat
 Bob Young (mayor) (born 1948), mayor of Augusta, Georgia and news anchor
 Robert D. Young (politician) (1934–2013), Michigan politician
 Bob Young (Ohio politician) (born 1982), Ohio state representative

Religion
 Robert A. Young (minister) (1824–1902), American Methodist minister
 Robert D. Young (LDS Church leader) (1867–1962), leader in The Church of Jesus Christ of Latter-day Saints
 Robert Newton Young (born 1829), President of the Methodist Conference in 1886
 Robert Young (biblical scholar) (1822–1888), Scottish publisher, author of Young's Literal Translation of the Bible
 Robert Young (clergyman) (1796–1865), President of the Methodist Conference in 1856
 Robert Young (priest) (died 1716), Canon of Windsor

Sports

American football
 Bob Young (American football coach) (born 1939), American college football player and coach
 Bob Young (offensive lineman) (1942–1995), American NFL football player
 Robert Young (American football) (born 1969), American NFL football player

Association football (soccer)
 Robert Young (footballer) (1886–1955), Scottish footballer 
 Bob Young (Scottish footballer) (1886–1970), Scottish footballer
 Bob Young (footballer, born 1886) Scottish footballer
 Bob Young (footballer, born 1894) (1894–1960), English association football manager

Other sports
 Robert Bruce Young (1858–1927), Scottish rugby union player
 Robert Young (athlete) (1916–2011), American track athlete
 Bobby Young (1925–1985), American baseball player
 Bob Young (cricketer) (1933–2014), Scottish cricketer
 Robert Young (rugby union) (born 1940), Scottish rugby union player
 Bobby Young (curler) (fl. 1959–1962), Scottish curler
 Bobby Joe Young (born 1959), American boxer
 Robert W. Young (martial arts) (born 1960s), American martial artist, executive editor of Black Belt
 Robert Young (runner) (born 1982), British endurance runner
 Robbie Young (Australian footballer) (born 1995), Australian rules footballer

Other
 Bob Young (businessman), Canadian founder and CEO of Red Hat
 Robert Brewer Young (born 1967), cello, viola, and violin maker
 Robert Brown Young (1851–1914), Canadian-born architect in California
 Robert R. Young (1897–1958), American financier and industrialist
 Robert Vaughn Young (1938–2003), American critic of Scientology
 Robert Young (architect) (1822–1917), Irish architect on List of Privy Counsellors of Ireland
 Robert Young (forger) (1657–1700), English forger and cheat
 Robert Young (sternwheeler), ship

See also
 Robert De Young, member of the Florida House of Representatives
 Bert Young (disambiguation)
 Young (surname)